Edward McHugh may refer to:
 Edward McHugh (trade unionist) (1853–1915), Irish Georgist (land reformer), trade unionist, Labour activist and social reformer
 Edward McHugh (politician) (1846–1900), Irish nationalist politician, an Anti-Parnellite Member of Parliament for South Armagh, 1892–1900
 Edward McHugh (artist) (born 1969), Philadelphia artist
 Ed McHugh (born 1930), American soccer player